The Chewinggum Weekend was a Japanese rock band formed in Sapporo, Japan in 1991. The band released two full-length albums and a handful of singles before  disbanding in 1999. The band saw moderate success in Japan, and still draws new listeners due to bassist Jun Suzuki who moved on to join The Pillows in 1999. Guitarist Kōji Iwata went on to perform as a solo artist under the moniker "HERMIT" on Sawao Yamanaka's Deicious Label.

Members
Takashi Hashimoto (Vocals/Guitar)
Koji Iwata (Guitar)
Jun Suzuki (Bass)
Fumihisa Natsuaki (Drums)

Discography

Singles
Ano ko wo tsukamaete (November 21, 1996)
Ice (June 1, 1997)
Romance (May 21, 1998)
Killer Babe (April 21, 1999)
Gloria (April 10, 2000)
Crawl (September 8, 2000)
Mirror Ball (June 22, 2001)

Albums
The Chewinggum Weekend (January 22, 1997)
Killing Pop (August 2, 1998)

External links
The Chewinggum Weekend official website
the pillows official website
Delicious Label Official Site

Japanese rock music groups
Musical groups from Hokkaido
Musical groups established in 1991
1991 establishments in Japan